Milton State Bank, also known as the Branch Bank of the Bank of the State of North Carolina at Milton, is a historic bank building located at Milton, Caswell County, North Carolina.  It was built in 1860, and is a two-story, three bay by five bay, Greek Revival style brick building. It housed a bank on the first floor and residential unit on the second. It housed a bank until about 1914. From about 1914 to 1963 the building served as a combination residence and the Milton Post Office.  It was subsequently converted to residential usage.

It was added to the National Register of Historic Places in 1973. It is located in the Milton Historic District.

Currently Milton Renaissance Foundation, a nonprofit, leases the building and houses a museum and visitors center.

References

Bank buildings on the National Register of Historic Places in North Carolina
Greek Revival architecture in North Carolina
Commercial buildings completed in 1860
Buildings and structures in Caswell County, North Carolina
National Register of Historic Places in Caswell County, North Carolina
Historic district contributing properties in North Carolina